František Brezničan (born 25 June 1983 in Považská Bystrica) is a Slovak football defender who currently plays for FK Junior Kanianka.

Career

Club
In March 2011, he joined Górnik Polkowice. He was released half year later.

References

External links
 
 Profile at feribreznican.webnode.sk 
 Profile at ksgornik.com.pl 
 

1983 births
Living people
Association football defenders
Slovak footballers
Slovak expatriate footballers
MFK Vítkovice players
MFK Karviná players
FK Fotbal Třinec players
MŠK Púchov players
FK Bodva Moldava nad Bodvou players
Górnik Polkowice players
MŠK Považská Bystrica (football) players
Sportspeople from Považská Bystrica
Slovak expatriate sportspeople in Poland
Slovak expatriate sportspeople in Austria
Expatriate footballers in Poland
Expatriate footballers in Austria